Bonticou Crag is a mountain in the Shawangunk Mountains, located in the Catskill Mountains of New York south of High Falls. Formally Known as Bunticoo Point and Bontecou Crag. Guyot Hill is located west-southwest of Bonticou Crag.

Gallery

References

Mountains of Ulster County, New York
Mountains of New York (state)